The Inge Solar Memorial – Alpen Trophy, or simply Alpen Trophy or Inge Solar Trophy is a senior- and junior-level figure skating competition held in Innsbruck, Austria. Named after Austrian Olympic figure skater Inge Solar, the inaugural event was part of the 2018–19 ISU Challenger Series. Medals may be awarded in men's singles, ladies' singles, pairs, and ice dance on the senior and junior levels.

Senior medalists
CS: ISU Challenger Series

Men

Ladies

Pairs

Ice dancing

Junior medalists

Men

Ladies

Pairs

Ice dancing

Advanced novice medalists

Men

Ladies

References

 
ISU Challenger Series
International figure skating competitions hosted by Austria